Galinthias philbyi, common name Yemen mantis, is a species of praying mantis native to Yemen and Saudi Arabia.

See also
List of mantis genera and species

References

Galinthiadidae
Endemic fauna of Saudi Arabia
Endemic fauna of Yemen
Taxa named by Boris Uvarov
Insects described in 1936